CGIProxy is a CGI proxy software package. When used, a CGI (Common Gateway Interface) proxy appears to a user as a web page that allows the user to access a different site through it, in most cases anonymously. An anonymous CGI Proxy is a proxy server that works through a web form embedded on another web page

Features
CGIProxy is written in the Perl programming language. It can be installed on any web server which can execute a Perl program via CGI, and which supports Non-Parsed Header CGI scripts. In addition, it can be installed under mod_perl as an FastCGI script, or as a standalone daemon. Supported protocols include HTTP, FTP and SSL, as well as related technologies: JavaScript, Adobe Flash.

History
CGIProxy development stalled between December 25, 2008, and December 9, 2011 but later saw six releases in 2014 with quite an extensive changelog, including Windows support.

License
Though the nature of the Perl language practically requires that the source code of CGIProxy is visible to those who install it, CGIProxy is not technically open-source software due to its commercial license fee.  It is extensively commented and modularized and has been designed from the start to encourage users to modify and extend it for their own purposes. The author licenses it to be used freely for non-commercial use and will negotiate license terms for commercial use.

References

External links
 Official website

Web server software
Perl software